Zotalemimon subglabratum is a species of beetle in the family Cerambycidae. It was described by Gressitt in 1938, originally under the genus Sydonia.

References

subglabratum
Beetles described in 1938